This is a timeline of Catalan history, comprising important legal and territorial changes and political events in Catalonia and its predecessor states and polities. To read about the background to these events, see History of Catalonia.

8th century

9th century

10th century

11th century

12th century

13th century

14th century

15th century

16th century

17th century

18th century

19th century

20th century

21st century

See also 
City and town timelines
 Timeline of Barcelona
 Timeline of Lleida

References

Bibliography

External links
Catalonia Profile: Timeline, BBC News

Catalonian
Catalonia-related lists